Henrique Teixeira de Sousa (September 19, 1919 in São Lourenço on the island of Fogo – March 3, 2006) was a doctor and author from Cape Verde.

Biography
Teixeira de Sousa graduated in 1945 in Lisbon with a degree in Medicine, having attended in the following year the Institute of Tropical Medicine in Porto. He later specialized in nutrition and initially went to East Timor to work as a doctor there. Teixeira de Sousa settled on his natal island of Fogo the following year, where he had an important role in maintaining minimal structures of public health. Later on, he worked on the island of São Vicente, until he emigrated shortly before the independence of the archipelago from Portugal, and moved to Oeiras, Portugal, where he lived until his death in 2006.

Teixeira de Sousa wrote fiction, including novels, and was a pupil of Baltasar Lopes da Silva. He was a member of the Claridoso Movement, associated with the Claridade magazine. He is one of the icons of Cape Verde literature, together with other names such as Manuel Lopes, Eugénio Tavares and Jorge Barbosa.

In one of his article, it analysed the social structure of Fogo, his native islands, both in his novels and in his essays, showed the concern of white families with the rise of the mixed in the late 1940s, they feared the moment that "the blacks would be pushed into the funco ; [where] it would take the place of the mixed with the loja and the latter would put the Whites to the sobrado.

Teixeira de Sousa was also the mayor of Mindelo, on the island of São Vicente, in the 1960s.

Legacy
A high school (lyceum) in the city of São Filipe on his native island is named after him.

Since 2014, he is featured on a Capeverdean $200 escudo note.  His face is featured on two sides.  It features most of his native island's map, a grape is on the top of the map.  On the back is Chã das Caldeiras and Pico do Fogo, the two features of his native island.

Works
Homens de hoje (1944/45) - featured in the Certeza review
"Sobrados, lojas e funcos", appeared in the fifth issue of Claridade magazine, published in 1958
Contra Mar e Vento [Over Sea and Wind] (1972) - book of tales
Ilhéu de Contenda [The Island of Content'] (1978) - (first of a trilogy) adapted into a drama film The Island of Contenda in 1996Capitão de Mar e Terra  [Captain of Sea and Land] (1984)Xaguate (1987) - second of a trilogyDjunga (1990)Na Ribeira de Deus (1992) - third of a trilogyEntre duas Bandeiras  [Between Two Flags] (1994)Ó Mar de Túrbidas Vagas'' (2005)

References

External links

Claridiade at Cabo Index
Henrique Teixeira de Sousa at Livro di Tera 
Henrique Teixeira de Sousa at Memória África at the University of Algarve
https://web.archive.org/web/20070927225554/http://www.fflch.usp.br/dlcv/posgraduacao/ecl/pdf/via04/via04_19.pdf

1919 births
2006 deaths
Cape Verdean male writers
Cape Verdean physicians
Medical writers
People from Fogo, Cape Verde
Presidents of municipalities in Cape Verde
Cape Verdean expatriates in Portugal
20th-century physicians